Alena Sharp (born March 7, 1981) is a Canadian professional golfer currently playing on the LPGA Tour. A graduate of New Mexico State University, where she played on the golf team, Sharp turned professional in 2003, playing two seasons on the Futures Tour and on other minor tours before joining the LPGA Tour in 2005.

Personal life 
In 2017, Sharp came out as a lesbian woman.

Professional wins (9)

Symetra Tour wins (1)
2014 Visit Mesa Gateway Classic

Canadian Women's Tour (2)
2004 (1) Canadian PGA Women's Championship
2005 (1) Canadian PGA Women's Championship

West Coast Ladies Golf Tour (4)
2004 (4) Inland Empire Open, The International, Estrella Summer Classic, Vistal Classic

Cactus Tour (2)
2009 (2) two wins

Team appearances
Amateur
Espirito Santo Trophy (representing Canada): 2000
Professional
World Cup (representing Canada): 2008

References

External links 
 
 
 
 
 
 
 

Canadian female golfers
LPGA Tour golfers
Olympic golfers of Canada
Golfers at the 2016 Summer Olympics
Golfers at the 2020 Summer Olympics
LGBT golfers
Golfing people from Ontario
New Mexico State University alumni
Lesbian sportswomen
Canadian LGBT sportspeople
Sportspeople from Hamilton, Ontario
1981 births
Living people
21st-century Canadian LGBT people